Beth Hillel Synagogue is a Jewish synagogue on Irving Avenue in Deerfield Township, Cumberland County, New Jersey, United States.

It was built in 1901 and added to the National Register of Historic Places in 1978.

See also
National Register of Historic Places listings in Cumberland County, New Jersey

References

Synagogues in New Jersey
Synagogues completed in 1901
Buildings and structures in Cumberland County, New Jersey
Religious buildings and structures in Cumberland County, New Jersey
National Register of Historic Places in Cumberland County, New Jersey
New Jersey Register of Historic Places
Synagogues on the National Register of Historic Places in New Jersey
Deerfield Township, New Jersey